The Japanese team will compete at the 2011 World Aquatics Championships in Shanghai, China.

Medalists

Diving

There will be 8 divers (4 men & 4 females) that will compete at the 2011 World Aquatics Championships, including four-time Olympian Ken Terauchi (as of April 12, 2011).

Men

Women

Open water swimming

Men

Women

Swimming

There will be 26 swimmers (15 men & 11 females) that will compete at the 2011 World Aquatics Championships.

Men

 * raced in heats only

Women

 * lost play-off race against Haruka Ueda
 ** raced in heats only

Synchronized swimming

Japan has qualified 11 athletes in synchronised swimming.

Women

Reserves
Miho Arai
Yuma Kawai

Water polo

Men

Team Roster 

Katsuyuki Tanamura
Kan Aoyagi – Captain
Koji Takei
Shota Hazui
Mitsuaki Shiga
Akira Yanase
Yusuke Shimizu
Atsushi Naganuma
Hiroki Wakamatsu
Yoshinori Shiota
Keigo Okawa
Satoshi Nagata
Naoki Shimizu

Group C

Playoff round

Classification 9–12

Eleventh place game

Medal table

Medalists

References

2011 in Japanese sport
Nations at the 2011 World Aquatics Championships
Japan at the World Aquatics Championships